Sheldon van der Linde (born 13 May 1999) is a South African motor racing driver. He has been competing in the Deutsche Tourenwagen Masters since 2019 and is currently the DTM champion, after winning his maiden title in 2022.

Career
van der Linde begun his motorsport career at the age of six, racing karts in his native South Africa. He would go on to win multiple national titles before making the transition to racing cars in 2014. In his first season of car racing, van der Linde won the South Africa Polo Cup Championship in dominant fashion. He would go on to win the Volkswagen Cup South Africa the following year.

For 2016, van der Linde raced in the Audi Sport TT Cup, one of the support categories of the Deutsche Tourenwagen Masters. He would make an immediate impact, winning both races of the opening round at the Hockenheimring. Scoring multiple podiums, as well as two wins, secured van der Linde fourth in his debut season. Thereafter, he has competed in the WeatherTech SportsCar Championship, ADAC GT Masters, and both Blancpain GT Series'.

DTM

2019 
In January 2019, it was announced that van der Linde would be driving for BMW Team RBM in the 2019 Deutsche Tourenwagen Masters season; thereby making him the first South African driver to compete in the series. He scored a pole position at Zolder and finished 13th in the standings, 19 points behind teammate Joel Eriksson.

2020 
van der Linde remained with RBM for the 2020 season, this time alongside Philipp Eng. His season started out strongly, scoring his first DTM podium at the second round of the campaign at the Lausitzring. The South African followed that up by winning race 2 at Assen, a race in which he scored the fastest lap as well. A consistent season helped van der Linde to sixth in the championship, finishing as the second-highest BMW driver, narrowly missing out to Timo Glock.

2021 
For 2021, the first DTM season to be run under Group GT3 regulations, van der Linde switched over to partner Glock at ROWE Racing as the team fielded a pair of BMW M6 GT3 cars in what proved to be their only season in the series. In the first seven races, he recorded five finishes in the top 10. After a fourth-place finish in the second race of the first round at Monza, he started from pole position and led 21 laps in the first race of the second round at the Lausitzring, but eventually received a five-second time penalty for a pit-stop infringement and finished in ninth place. After experiencing his first retirement of the season in the second race of the fourth round at the Nürburgring, he also retired from both races of the next round at the Red Bull Ring. He finished sixth in the first race of the sixth round at Assen, before experiencing four consecutive retirements. His campaign ended with an eleventh-place finish in the drivers' standings, with the fourth-place finish at Monza remaining his best race result.

2022 
For the 2022 season, van der Linde was chosen to partner Philipp Eng at Schubert Motorsport as the team entered the DTM for the first time by fielding a pair of BMW M4 GT3 cars. In the second round of the season at the Lausitzring, he won both races. He scored his third victory of the season in the first race of the fifth round at the Nürburgring, finishing ahead of his brother, Kelvin. It was the first time that two brothers finished 1-2 in a DTM race. Going into the final round at the Hockenheimring, van der Linde was 11 points ahead of Mercedes driver Lucas Auer in the drivers' standings. In the Saturday race, which Auer won, van der Linde finished second after starting from 16th due to a 10-place grid penalty. He went into the Sunday race two points ahead of Auer in the drivers' standings, eventually winning his maiden title with a third-place finish, which put him 11 points ahead of Auer, who finished the race in seventh, in the final drivers' standings.

Racing record

Career summary

* Season still in progress.

Complete IMSA SportsCar Championship results
(key) (Races in bold indicate pole position; results in italics indicate fastest lap)

* Season still in progress.

Complete Deutsche Tourenwagen Masters results
(key) (Races in bold indicate pole position) (Races in italics indicate fastest lap)

References

External links
 

Sportspeople from Johannesburg
South African racing drivers
Living people
1999 births
White South African people
Deutsche Tourenwagen Masters drivers
Audi Sport TT Cup drivers
WeatherTech SportsCar Championship drivers
ADAC GT Masters drivers
Blancpain Endurance Series drivers
BMW M drivers
Audi Sport drivers
Racing Bart Mampaey drivers
Schnitzer Motorsport drivers
Rowe Racing drivers
Rahal Letterman Lanigan Racing drivers
Nürburgring 24 Hours drivers
Comtoyou Racing drivers
South African expatriate sportspeople in Germany
W Racing Team drivers